Miss Grand Italy 2022 was the 4th edition of the Miss Grand Italy beauty pageant, held from 14 – 18 September 2022 at Grand Hotel Pianeta Maratea, Maratea in the Province of Potenza. Thirty-nine contestants chosen by various local organizers through their regional pageant competed for the title, of which an eighteen-year-old girl Miriam Malerba from Apulia was named the winner. Malerba later represented the country at the international competition, Miss Grand International 2022, held in Bali and Jakarta, Indonesia on 25 October. but got non-placement.

In addition to the main winner, Giada Cinquegrana of Campania was named Miss Mascot, awarded to contestants aged between 13 – 16 years old, and Vanessa Ortiz of Lombardy was elected Miss Glamour International Italy.

Background

History
After finishing the 2021 national competition session in Rome, the pageant organizer – 	MUPI SRL. – subsequently franchising the 2022 license to each regional licensee; the first local pageant to select the candidates for the regional contest was happening in early December in Abruzzo, followed by several local pageants held in each region countrywide. The venue of the final national competition, Grand Hotel Pianetamaratea of Maratea, was later announced in May 2022.

Participants selection
The national finalists of Miss Grand Italy 2022 were chosen by the regional organizers, entitled by the central organ MUPI SRL to select their representatives, through the regional pageants. Several regional organs held multiple audition events or local contests to determine the finalists for their regional pageant, e.g., 5 local pageants and 1 audition were held in the Emilia-Romagna region. Similar to the national pageant, the regional contest of Miss Grand Italy is also divided into two categories including (1) the Main category for contestants aged between 17 – 28 years old, the winner of which will compete for the Miss Grand Italy title at the national stage, and (2) a mascot category for the contestants aged between 13 – 16 years old, the winner will also enter the same national stage with the senior category but the national winner will not be sent to compete in any international pageant.

Only one delegate, Alessia Stissi of Sicily, was directly elected by the national organizer through online voting from 1 February to 31 August on the official website. For such a process, each regional representative, who registered via online registration, was allocated into a group of 15 – 18, 12 groups in total. The winner of each group was determined through public voting on the organizer's website, the contestant with the most vote in each group qualified for the final voting round to select a final winner to compete in the national final stage.

Regional pageant

National online voting
Color key

Results summary

Placement

Candidates
42 delegates have been confirmed to compete for the national title of Miss Grand Italy 2022.

References

External links

 

Miss Grand Italy
Italian awards
Grand Italy